Aval Mella Sirithal is a 1987 Indian Tamil-language drama film directed by M. N. Jai Sundar in his debut. The film stars Murali, Seetha and Madhuri. It was released on 29 December 1987.

Plot

Cast 
Murali
Seetha
Madhuri
Raveendran
M. R. Krishnamurthy
S. S. Chandran
Chinni Jayanth
Charle
Devika Rani
Babu Mohan
Kallapetti Singaram
Loose Mohan

Production 
Aval Mella Sirithal is the directorial debut of M. N. Jai Sundar.

Soundtrack 
The soundtrack was composed by Shankar Ganesh.
"Seetha Seetha" – Mano, K. S. Chithra
"Aavaram Poovathan" – K. S. Chithra
"Medai Meethu" – SPB, K. S. Chithra
"Degamengum" – Mano, K. S. Chithra

Reception 
The Indian Express wrote, "For a film that is a director's first, Aval Mella Sirithaal seemed, initially, to be passable. The action was staged with a degree of conviction. But slowly, and alas, surely, the film got mired in its contradictions and rhetoric, and the approach to the climax was nothing if not absurd."

References

External links 
 

1980s Tamil-language films
1987 directorial debut films
1987 drama films
1987 films
Films scored by Gangai Amaran
Indian drama films